Neighbourly is a neighbourhood-based social networking website operating in New Zealand. 

The website was founded by Casey Eden. It was trialled in two Auckland suburbs, St Heliers and Kohimarama, in December 2013, then launched nationally in June 2015.

In December 2014, Fairfax Media New Zealand bought a 22.5 percent stake in the website. In 2017 it acquired the remaining shares. Following changes to Fairfax Media in 2018, the website is now owned by Stuff Ltd.

In 2015, the website was a finalist in the NZI Sustainable Business Network Awards in the Community Impact category.

References

External links
Neighbourly

New Zealand websites
2013 establishments in New Zealand